Annunciation Monastery is a Benedictine monastery in Bismarck, North Dakota, USA associated with the University of Mary. The monastery's building was designed by noted modernist architect Marcel Breuer and constructed from 1959 to 1963.

Gallery

See also
Our Lady of the Annunciation Chapel at Annunciation Priory

References 

University of Mary
Marcel Breuer buildings
Religious buildings and structures completed in 1963
Buildings and structures in Bismarck, North Dakota